Harry Bardle (born 18 June 2000) is a professional rugby league footballer who plays as a  for Hull Kingston Rovers in the Super League.

Background
Bardle was born in Kingston upon Hull, East Riding of Yorkshire, England.

Career
In 2019 he made his Hull Kingston Rovers Super League début against the Huddersfield Giants.

References

External links
Hull KR profile
SL profile

2000 births
Living people
Rugby league props
Hull Kingston Rovers players